Lily Hevesh is an American domino artist and YouTuber working under the channel name Hevesh5.

Hevesh is the subject of the documentary film Lily Topples the World directed by Jeremy Workman and executive produced by actress Kelly Marie Tran.

Personal life 
Hevesh is a Chinese-born adoptee from Sandown, New Hampshire, and has two siblings, Alissa and Matt. She was given her first set of dominoes at age 10.

Hevesh attended Timberlane Regional High School. She attended Rensselaer Polytechnic Institute, where she was a "Design, Innovation, and Society" major, but left after less than a year to pursue domino art full-time. She currently lives in Massachusetts, west of Boston. She hopes that her work would encourage more children to get involved in STEAM fields.

Career

YouTube 
Hevesh created her YouTube channel Hevesh5, a reference to her being the fifth member of the family, in 2009 at the age of 10. As of March 2021, her YouTube channel has 3 million subscribers and 1 billion views. Her first viral video, "INSANE Domino Tricks!", was posted in 2013 and had over 163 million views in March 2021.

Hevesh posted anonymously for 6.5 years before revealing her identity in 2015 via a YouTube video.

In December 2018, YouTube used Hevesh's video "A Merry Domino Christmas" on their Twitter account without giving Hevesh credit. After Hevesh tweeted criticism of YouTube for co-opting her video for promotional purposes without crediting her, YouTube publicly apologized and tweeted credit for the video.

Hevesh worked with Endemol Shine North America to create a competitive reality show around building domino effect chains tentatively called Domino Effect, in the same vein as Endemol's Lego Masters, announced in August 2020. In March 2021, RTL 4 Netherlands and France's M6 ordered local versions of the domino competition format created by Hevesh and Endemol.

Domino set 
In 2020, Hevesh and Spin Master launched H5 Domino Creations at the North American International Toy Fair in New York City. The set comes with 100 improved dominoes which Hevesh described as being "specially made for toppling".

Domino art 
She was approached by Campbell Soup Company in 2013 to create a commercial for them. Since 2014, Hevesh's domino art has been featured at the annual Brattleboro Museum and Art Center Domino Toppling Extravaganza.

She has since created ads for companies—such as Prudential Financial, Ford Motors, and Honda— and films such as The Hunger Games: Catching Fire and Despicable Me. She was part of the team commissioned to set up dominoes for a scene in Collateral Beauty. In 2017, Hevesh was hired by Marvel to create a Spider-Man-inspired domino art piece.

Lily Topples the World 
In 2021, a documentary about Hevesh titled Lily Topples the World premiered at the virtual South by Southwest, where it won the Grand Jury Prize in the Documentary Feature Film Competition. Soon after, the film won the Audience Award for Best Documentary at the 2021 San Francisco International Film Festival. It was directed by Jeremy Workman. Lily Topples The World was produced by Robert Lyons and executive produced by actress Kelly Marie Tran in her first producing role.

Awards 
Hevesh was listed on the 2020 Forbes 30 Under 30 list in the category "Art & Style". She was one of the United States Junior Chamber's Ten Outstanding Young Americans in 2022.

References

External links 
 

American YouTubers
Rensselaer Polytechnic Institute alumni
Artists from New Hampshire
Living people
American adoptees
Chinese emigrants to the United States
YouTube channels launched in 2013
1998 births